This article contains information about the literary events and publications of 1986.

Events
April 29 – A major fire at Los Angeles Public Library caused by arson destroys 400,000 volumes.
July 21 – Michael Grade, Controller of BBC1, axes plans to televise Ian Curteis's The Falklands Play.
September 29 – Bloomsbury Publishing is set up in London by Nigel Newton.
October 9 – The Phantom of the Opera, having been the longest running Broadway show ever, opens at Her Majesty's Theatre in London.
December 19 – The Soviet dissident author Andrei Sakharov is allowed to return to Moscow after six years' internal exile.

New books

Fiction
Kingsley Amis – The Old Devils
V. C. Andrews – Garden of Shadows
Piers Anthony – Ghost
Jeffrey Archer – A Matter of Honour
James Axler – Pilgrimage to Hell and Red Holocaust
Iain Banks – The Bridge
Thomas Bernhard – Extinction (Auslöschung)
Azouz Begag – Le Gone du Chaâba
Anita Brookner – A Misalliance
Orson Scott Card – Speaker for the Dead
Ana Castillo – Mixquiahuala Letters
Tom Clancy – Red Storm Rising
Arthur C. Clarke – The Songs of Distant Earth
James Clavell – Whirlwind
Jackie Collins – Hollywood Husbands
Pat Conroy – The Prince of Tides
Hugh Cook – The Wizards and the Warriors
Bernard Cornwell – Sharpe's Regiment
Bernard & Judy Cornwell (as Susannah Kells) – Coat of Arms (also as The Aristocrats)
Fernando Del Paso – Noticias del Imperio
Marguerite Duras – Blue Eyes, Black Hair
James Ellroy – Silent Terror
Shusaku Endo (遠藤 周作) – Scandal (スキャンダル)
Steve Erickson – Rubicon Beach
Nuruddin Farah – Maps (first part of Blood in the Sun trilogy)
Richard Ford – The Sportswriter
Katherine V. Forrest – An Emergence of Green
John Gardner – Nobody Lives For Ever
Jacques Godbout – Une Histoire américaine
Peter Handke – Repetition
Ernest Hemingway -  The Garden of Eden 
Carl Hiaasen – Tourist Season
Kazuo Ishiguro – An Artist of the Floating World
Brian Jacques – Redwall
Stephen King – It
Ivan Klíma – Láska a smetí (Love and Garbage, banned until 1989)
Judith Krantz – I'll Take ManhattanBrigitte Kronauer – Berittener BogenschützeLouis L'Amour – Last of the BreedJoe R. Lansdale – Dead in the WestJohn le Carré – A Perfect SpyDavid Leavitt – The Lost Language of CranesTanith Lee – Dreams of Dark and Light: The Great Short Fiction of Tanith LeeGordon Lish – Dear Mr. CapoteH. P. Lovecraft – Dagon and Other Macabre Tales (corrected edition)
Robert Ludlum – The Bourne SupremacyAmin Maalouf – Leo AfricanusJavier Marías – El hombre sentimental (The Man of Feeling, 2003)
Allan Massie – Augustus (first in the Roman series)
Frank Miller – Batman: The Dark Knight Returns (graphic novel)
Robert Munsch – Love You ForeverPatrick O'Brian – The Reverse of the MedalEllis PetersThe Raven in the ForegateThe Rose RentTerry Pratchett – The Light FantasticReynolds Price – Kate VaidenJames Purdy – In the Hollow of His HandJean Raspail – Who Will Remember the People...Mercè Rodoreda (died 1983) – La mort i la primavera (Death in Spring)
Rafael Sánchez Ferlosio – El testimonio de YarfozJosé Saramago – The Year of the Death of Ricardo Reis (O Ano da Morte de Ricardo Reis)Ken Saro-Wiwa – Sozaboy: A Novel in Rotten EnglishIdries Shah – Kara KushDanielle Steel – WanderlustPeter Taylor – A Summons to MemphisJames Tiptree, Jr. – Tales of the Quintana RooMario Vargas Llosa – Who Killed Palomino Molero? (¿Quién mató a Palomino Molero?)Vladimir Voinovich – Moscow 2042Roger Zelazny – Blood of AmberChildren and young people
Janet and Allan Ahlberg – The Jolly PostmanChris Van Allsburg – The StrangerTony Bradman – Dilly the Dinosaur (first in the eponymous series of 22 books)
Steven Brust (with Alan Lee) – Brokedown PalaceRobert J. Burch – Queenie PeavyJoy Cowley
(with Jan van der Voo) – Turnips For Dinner(with Martin Bailey) – The King's PuddingCrescent Dragonwagon – Half a Moon and One Whole StarJill Eggleton (with Kelvin Hawley) – Cat and MouseBerniece T. Hiser – The Adventure of Charlie and His Wheat-Straw HatDiana Wynne Jones – Howl's Moving CastleMichael de LarrabeitiThe Borribles: Across the Dark MetropolisThe Provençal TalesArnold Lobel – The Random House Book of Mother Goose (in verse)
Ann M. MartinKristy's Great IdeaClaudia and the Phantom Phone CallsThe Truth about Stacey (first three in The Baby-Sitters Club series of over 200 books, 35 written by Martin)
Patricia McKissack – Flossie & the FoxRobert Munsch – Love You ForeverJill Murphy – Five Minutes' Peace (first in The Large Family series)
Jenny Nimmo – The Snow Spider (first in The Magician Trilogy)
Bill Peet – Zella, Zack, and ZodiacClaude Ponti – Adele's AlbumAlison Prince – The Type One Super RobotGillian Rubinstein – Space DemonsDrama
Caryl Churchill and David Lan – A Mouthful of BirdsNick Darke – The Dead MonkeyTomson Highway – The Rez SistersChinu Modi – AshwamedhWilly Russell – Shirley ValentineArvo Salo – Vallan miehetTom Stoppard – Dalliance (based on a work by Arthur Schnitzler)

Poetry
Kama Sywor Kamanda – Chants de brumes (Songs of twilight)

Non-fiction
Dave Stieb (with Kevin Boland) - Tomorrow I'll be PerfectMartin Amis – The Moronic Inferno: And Other Visits to AmericaBernard Bailyn – Voyagers to the West: A Passage in the Peopling of America on the Eve of the RevolutionFrank Barlow – Thomas BecketMarjorie Chibnall – Anglo-Norman England 1066–1166Richard Dawkins – The Blind WatchmakerKarlheinz Deschner – Kriminalgeschichte des Christentums (Criminal History of Christianity)
Adrian Edmondson et al. – How to be a Complete BastardSita Ram Goel – History of Hindu–Christian Encounters, AD 304 to 1996Temple Grandin (with Margaret Scariano) – Emergence: Labeled AutisticPatience Gray – Honey from a Weed (cookery)
Robert Irwin – The Middle East in the Middle Ages: The Early Mamlúk Sultanate 1250–1382Kumari Jayawardena – Feminism and Nationalism in the Third WorldMark Mathabane – Kaffir BoyFarley Mowat – My Discovery of AmericaHarvey Pekar – American Splendor: The Life and Times of Harvey Pekar (graphic autobiography)
Marc Reisner – Cadillac DesertRichard Rhodes – The Making of the Atomic BombJonathan Riley-Smith – The First Crusade and the Idea of CrusadingRoger Scruton – Sexual Desire: A Philosophical InvestigationArt Spiegelman – Maus: A Survivor's Tale (I: My Father Bleeds History) (graphic biography/autobiography)
Jean Vercoutter – The Search for Ancient EgyptMary Wilson – Dreamgirl: My Life As a SupremeBirths
January 24 - Aimee Carter, American young-adult fiction writer
June 6 - Rachelle Dekker, American science-fiction writer
July 3 – Chris Bush, English playwright, artistic director and comedianunknown datesCaroline Bird, English poet and dramatist
Chigozie Obioma, Nigerian novelist

Deaths
January 1 – Lord David Cecil, English critic and biographer (born 1902)
January 4 – Christopher Isherwood, English-born novelist (born 1904)
January 7 
P. D. Eastman, American author and illustrator (born 1909)
Juan Rulfo, Mexican writer, screenwriter and photographer (born 1917)
January 24 – L. Ron Hubbard, American science fiction writer, founder of Scientology (born 1911)
February 4 – Phyllis Shand Allfrey, Dominican writer (born 1908)
February 9 – Dora Oake Russell, Newfoundland writer, diarist and journalist (born 1912)
February 11 – Frank Herbert, American science fiction novelist (born 1920)
February 28 – Edith Ditmas, English archivist, historian and writer (born 1896)
March 4
Ding Ling, Chinese fiction writer (born 1904)
Elizabeth Smart, Canadian poet and novelist (born 1913)
March 15 – Pandelis Prevelakis, Greek novelist, poet, dramatist and essayist (born 1909)
March 18 – Bernard Malamud, American novelist (born 1914)
April 12 – Valentin Kataev, Russian novelist and dramatist (born 1897)
April 14
Simone de Beauvoir, French philosopher and feminist writer (born 1908)
Jean Genet, French novelist, playwright, poet, essayist and political activist (born 1910)
April 17 – Bessie Head, Botswanan fiction writer (born 1937)
April 22 – Mircea Eliade, Romanian historian, philosopher and novelist (born 1907)
May 15 – Theodore H. White, American journalist, historian and novelist (born 1915)
June 14 – Jorge Luis Borges, Argentine writer (born 1899)
August 1 – Lena Kennedy, English romantic novelist (born 1914)
August 3 – Beryl Markham, English-born Kenyan aviator and author (born 1902)
August 20 – Milton Acorn, Canadian poet, writer and playwright (born 1923)
September 11 – Noel Streatfeild, English novelist and children's writer (born 1895)
December 17 – J. F. Hendry, Scottish poet (born 1912)
December 19 – V. C. Andrews, American novelist (born 1923)
December 28 – John D. MacDonald, American novelist and short story writer (born 1916)

Awards
Nobel Prize for Literature: Wole Soyinka

Australia
The Australian/Vogel Literary Award: Robin Walton, Glace FruitsC. J. Dennis Prize for Poetry: Rhyll McMaster, Washing the Money and John A. Scott, St. ClairKenneth Slessor Prize for Poetry: Robert Gray Selected Poems 1963–83Mary Gilmore Prize: Stephen Williams, A Crowd of VoicesMiles Franklin Award: Elizabeth Jolley, The WellCanada
See 1986 Governor General's Awards for a complete list of winners and finalists for those awards.

France
Prix Goncourt: Michel Host, Valet de nuitPrix Médicis French: Pierre Combescot, Les Funérailles de la SardinePrix Médicis International: John Hawkes, Aventures dans le commerce des peaux en AlaskaUnited Kingdom
Booker Prize: Kingsley Amis, The Old DevilsCarnegie Medal for children's literature: Berlie Doherty, Granny Was a Buffer GirlCholmondeley Award: Lawrence Durrell, James Fenton, Selima Hill
Eric Gregory Award: Mick North, Lachlan Mackinnon, Oliver Reynolds, Stephen Romer
James Tait Black Memorial Prize for fiction: Jenny Joseph, PersephoneJames Tait Black Memorial Prize for biography: D. Felicitas Corrigan, Helen WaddellQueen's Gold Medal for Poetry: Norman MacCaig
Whitbread Best Book Award: Kazuo Ishiguro, An Artist of the Floating WorldUnited States
Agnes Lynch Starrett Poetry Prize: Robley Wilson, Kingdoms of the OrdinaryAmerican Academy of Arts and Letters Gold Medal for Drama: Sidney Kingsley
Frost Medal: Allen Ginsberg / Richard Eberhart
Nebula Award: Orson Scott Card, Speaker For the DeadNewbery Medal for children's literature: Patricia MacLachlan, Sarah, Plain and TallPrometheus Award: Robert Shea and Robert Anton Wilson, The Illuminatus! TrilogyPulitzer Prize for Drama: no award givenPulitzer Prize for Fiction: Larry McMurtry, Lonesome DovePulitzer Prize for Poetry: Henry Taylor, The Flying ChangeWhiting Awards: Fiction: Kent Haruf, Denis Johnson, Padgett Powell, Mona Simpson; Poetry: John Ash, Hayden Carruth, Frank Stewart, Ruth Stone; Nonfiction: Darryl Pinckney (nonfiction/fiction); Plays: August Wilson

Elsewhere
Premio Nadal: Manuel Vicent, Balada de Caín''

References

 
Years of the 20th century in literature